Pangsau Pass or Pan Saung Pass,  in altitude, lies on the crest of the Patkai Hills on the India–Myanmar border. The pass offers one of the easiest routes into Burma from the Assam plains. It is named after the closest Burmese village, Pangsau, that lies 2 km beyond the pass to the east. To the east of Pangsau Pass, India's undisputed easternmost point "Chaukan Pass" lies and to the east of Vijaynagar in the Changlang district.

History

Early era 

During the 13th century, it was the frequently used route by Ahoms, a Shan tribe, for their arrival and settlement in Assam in India.

British raj era 

The British in the late 19th century looked at the pass as a possible railway route from India to Myitkyina in north Burma through the Hukawng Valley, all of which were part of the British Empire at the time, but no railway was built. They concluded that a track could be pushed through to Burma and down the Hukawng Valley. Although the proposal was dropped, the British prospected the Patkai Range for a road from Assam into northern Burma. British engineers had surveyed the route for a road for the first . 

During World War II the pass became famous because of the Stilwell Road (Ledo Road) connecting British India to Nationalist Chinese forces fighting the Japanese in China. The pass was the large initial obstacle encountered by United States General Joseph "Vinegar Joe" Stilwell's forces in their effort to build a land route to supplement The Hump air route (after the other land route, the Burma Road was lost to advancing Japanese forces).

Because of the fierce gradients and the mud, which made getting up to the pass difficult, it was nicknamed "Hell Pass" during the war.

Present era 

The Pangsau Pass Winter Festival since 2007 is a joint India-Myanmar 3 day annual global village event organized during the 3rd week of January  every year in Nampong, Arunachal Pradesh. It showcases diverse cultures of Northeast India and Myanmar including folk songs, folk dances, arts, crafts, ethnic foods, and traditional sports, and culture of Tangsa Naga tribe. Tangsa Rongrand War dance, Lungchang dance, Wancho dance, Bihu Dance, and Bamboo dance performances are held.

See also
Ledo Road (Stillwell Road)
Lake of No Return
Hukawng Valley

References

External links
Changlang District
Pangsau Pass Winter Festival 2009-Transcending Boundaries

Mountain passes of Meghalaya
Mountain passes of Myanmar

India–Myanmar border crossings
World War II sites in Burma